Chewang is a town in Cangshan County, in southern Shandong province, China. , it has 48 villages under its administration.

See also 
 List of township-level divisions of Shandong

References 

Township-level divisions of Shandong